Fahad Al-Mirdasi (born 16 August 1985) is a Saudi Arabian football referee who served as a full international for FIFA from 2011 to 2018, when he was banned for life for match fixing.

Refereeing career
Al-Mirdasi was one of the referees for the 2015 AFC Asian Cup. He officiated four games in the 2015 FIFA U-20 World Cup, including the final game.

Al-Mirdasi officiated at the men's football tournament at the 2016 Summer Olympics. He officiated the match between Sweden and Colombia in the group stage, with the game ending with a score of 2–2.

In 2017, Al-Mirdasi officiated at the 2017 FIFA Confederations Cup.

In 2018, the Saudi Arabian Football Federation (SAFF) issued Al-Mirdasi a lifetime ban from officiating based on allegations of match-fixing. Before the ban, FIFA had selected Al-Mirdasi to officiate at the 2018 FIFA World Cup, but on 30 May 2018, it was announced that he and his assistants were stood down from participating in the World Cup.

References

1985 births
Living people
Saudi Arabian football referees
People from Riyadh
People convicted of bribery
Sportspeople banned for life
Match fixers
Football referees at the 2016 Summer Olympics
AFC Asian Cup referees